The Burhaniye Atatürk Monument was a Bronze Atatürk sculpture by Gürdal Duyar in Edremit, Burhaniye, Turkey. It represents the events around the struggles of the Kuva-i Milliye during the Turkish War of Independence.

Description 

The sculpture depicts Atatürk standing and looking forward. His left arm is open and extended slightly backwards and down beside him with his hand at about hip-height; which is open and has the fingers spread out. His right hand is closed and over his heart in the middle of his chest.

Through the sculpture Gürdal Duyar tells a story of the many legendary events during the national struggle of the Kuva-yi Milliye in Burhaniye during the Turkish War of Independence. It is noted that tourists would often take a break at the sculpture and take photos of it. The sculpture became loved by many people of Burhaniye. One of these people was an old gardener who brought back seeds from The Netherlands and planted red, pink, marbled and white poppies that surpassed knee height. Poppies are also symbolic as a flower to remember the dead of war with.

History 
The sculpture was to be erected in Edremit, Burhaniye. The area where the sculpture was to be erected was designed by E. Demirok. The sculpture was inaugurated in 1967.

A monument to Borazan Ismail and Kadir Efe, which consists of a revolver and a bugle, is in front of Gürdal Duyars Atatürk Monument. This monument is still there in the present day. The Atatürk Monument however was at some point, at least later than 1974, removed with a bulldozer. A bulldozer came, broke the feet of the sculpture and brought it away. To this day it is unknown where it is.

References

Notes

Citations

Bibliography

 
 
 
 
 

1967 sculptures
Monuments and memorials to Mustafa Kemal Atatürk in Turkey
Outdoor sculptures in Turkey
Sculptures by Gürdal Duyar